American singer Madonna has released seventy-seven music videos, eleven concert tour videos, two documentary videos, four music video compilations, two music video box sets, four promotional videos, and four video singles. Nicknamed as the "Queen of Videos" or "Queen of MTV", her music videos were often considered by critics as works of art, depicting various social issues. Her early videos also received a significant academic attention. Madonna has won 20 MTV Video Music Awards, including the 1986 Video Vanguard Award for which she became the first female honoree. In 2003, MTV named her "The Greatest Music Video Star Ever", saying "Madonna's innovation, creativity and contribution to the music video art form is what won her the award." In 2020, Billboard ranked her at the top of their list "100 Greatest Music Video Artists of All Time".

Madonna's first video, "Everybody" (1982), was a low-budget work. Her first video to receive attention on MTV was "Borderline", followed by "Lucky Star" and "Like a Virgin", which popularized Madonna's image and fashion among younger generation. Her early videos were released commercially on Madonna (1984), which became the best-selling videocassette of 1985. With the title track from her third studio album True Blue (1986), Madonna's impact on MTV and popular music was established when a contest entitled Making My Video, was held to create a music video for the song. "La Isla Bonita" and "Who's That Girl", both released in 1987, showed Madonna's fascination with Hispanic culture and religious symbolism. In 1989, the video of "Like a Prayer" portrayed her dancing in front of burning crosses, receiving stigmata, kissing a black saint and having sex with him in a church altar. It faced strong reaction from religious groups and media. "Express Yourself" released the same year was critically appreciated for its positive feminist themes.

In 1990, Madonna released the video for the song "Vogue", showing the underground gay subculture dance routine called voguing, and the glamorous look of golden era Hollywood. She released her second video compilation, The Immaculate Collection (1990) to accompany the greatest hits album of the same name. She featured overtly sexual undertones with the videos of "Justify My Love" (1990) and "Erotica" (1992), which met with huge backlash. By this point, Madonna had sold between 3 to 4 million copies worldwide of her video releases. A toned down image of the singer appeared in the video for "Secret" from Bedtime Stories (1994). Inspired by paintings of Frida Kahlo and Remedios Varo, the music video of "Bedtime Story" is permanently displayed at the Museum of Modern Art in New York City. Madonna incorporated Asian culture on the videos of "Frozen" and "Nothing Really Matters" from her 1998 album Ray of Light. The video for its title track was a high-speed one, portraying Japanese people going through their daily lives, interspersed with Madonna in black denim dancing to the music. Most of her 1990s videos were released on The Video Collection 93:99.

Madonna reinvented her image as a cowgirl on the videos for "Music" and "Don't Tell Me" from her eighth studio album, Music (2000). Violence and vandalism were the themes of subsequent few releases, "What It Feels Like for a Girl" (2001), "Die Another Day" (2002) and "American Life" (2003), the latter being pulled from release due to the Iraq war of 2003. "Hung Up", lead single from Confessions on a Dance Floor (2005) was a tribute to John Travolta and his movies. Madonna's recent videos for "Celebration" (2009), "Girl Gone Wild" (2012), and "Living for Love" (2015) were received favorably for paying homage to her past videos and a return to her dance roots.

Music videos

1980s

1990s

2000s

2010s

2020s

Cameo appearances

Video albums

Concert tour videos

Documentary videos

Music video compilations

Music video box sets

Promotional videos

Video singles

See also

Madonna albums discography
Madonna singles discography
List of most expensive music videos
Censorship on MTV

References

Footnotes

Sources

External links
 Madonna Videography on YouTube
 Madonna Discography: Videos on Discogs

Videographies of American artists
Videography

de:Madonna/Diskografie
fr:Discographie de Madonna
ru:Дискография Мадонны
simple:Madonna discography